is a city tram station on the Man'yōsen Shinminatokō Line in Nishi Shinminato area of Imizu, Toyama Prefecture, Japan.

History
The station opened in 1933. The original station name was Chūgakkōmae, meaning Middle School. The station name was changed in 1949 to Nishi Shinminato, in 1985 to Shinminato Shiyakusho-mae (meaning Shinminato City Hall) and in 2005 to Imizu City Shinminato Chōsha-mae (meaning Imizu City Shinminato Office). The station name was restored to Nishi Shinminato from October 11, 2016 as the city office was relocated.

Surrounding area
Toyama Prefectural Shinminato Senior High School

References

Railway stations in Toyama Prefecture
Railway stations in Japan opened in 1933